Haplogroup HIJK, defined by the SNPs F929, M578, PF3494 and S6397, is a common Y-chromosome haplogroup. Like its parent macrohaplogroup GHIJK, Haplogroup HIJK and its subclades comprise the vast majority of the world's male population.

HIJK branches subsequently into two direct descendants: IJK (L15/M523/PF3492/S137) and H (L901/M2939). IJK in turn splits into IJ (F-L15) and K (M9). The descendants of Haplogroup IJ are haplogroups I and J, while Haplogroup K is, ultimately, the ancestor of major haplogroups M, N, O,  P, Q, R, S, L, and T.

Distribution
The basal paragroup HIJK* has been found in Mesolithic European (Magdalenian), GoyetQ-2, and the basal IJK was  found in an Upper Paleolithic European (Gravettian), Vestonice16.

Populations with high proportions of males who belong to descendant major haplogroups of Haplogroup HIJK live across widely dispersed areas and populations.

South Asia was where Haplogroup H (L901/M2939) almost certainly originated, and became concentrated before the mass migrations of the modern era. South Asia was also where two haplogroups descended ultimately from IJK (L15/M523/PF3492/S137) remained concentrated and/or prominent, namely Haplogroups L and R.

Males belonging to other subclades of IJK are concentrated in, for example:
 Europe and  Central Asia (e. g. haplogroups I, J, N, Q and R);
 the Middle East and North East Africa (e. g. haplogroups J and T);
South Asia (e.g. haplogroups H, J, L and R);
 Southeast Asia and East Asia (e.g. haplogroup N, O, P)
 Oceania (e. g. haplogroups P, K, M, O and S) and;
 many Native American peoples (e. g. haplogroup Q).

Footnotes

See also

Genetics

Backbone Tree

Human Y-DNA haplogroups
Human population genetics